Sir Archer Ernest Baldwin MC (30 December 1883 – 27 March 1966) was a farmer and British Conservative Party Member of Parliament (MP).

Baldwin was born in a log cabin near Rugby, Tennessee, United States, to where his parents had emigrated. Upon their return to England, he was sent to Lucton School, Herefordshire, and then entered the family business as a cattle and sheep breeder, as well as becoming an auctioneer and land agent.

He married in 1911 and served in the Royal Horse Artillery in the First World War, being awarded the Military Cross for bravery during a 1918 attack on the Hindenburg Line.

Baldwin was active in the National Farmers Union and after being elected as a Conservative MP in 1945, he became a Conservative spokesman on Agriculture, and was knighted in 1958. Baldwin served as the Member of Parliament for Leominster from 1945-59. At one point, he was a Deputy Lieutenant of Herefordshire. He died at his home in Tenbury Wells, Worcestershire, aged 82.

References
The Times, Obituary, 29 March 1966

External links 
 

1883 births
1966 deaths
Deputy Lieutenants of Herefordshire
British Army personnel of World War I
Royal Artillery officers
Recipients of the Military Cross
Conservative Party (UK) MPs for English constituencies
UK MPs 1945–1950
UK MPs 1950–1951
UK MPs 1951–1955
UK MPs 1955–1959
People from Tenbury Wells